Little Conneauttee Creek is a  long 3rd order tributary to Conneauttee Creek in Crawford County, Pennsylvania and Erie County, Pennsylvania.  This is the only stream of this name in the United States.

Variant names
According to the Geographic Names Information System, it has also been known historically as:
Little Conneautte Creek

Course
Little Conneautee Creek rises about 2 miles southeast of Reeds Corners, Pennsylvania, and then flows generally south to join Conneauttee creek about 1 mile south of Drakes Mills.

Watershed
Little Conneauttee Creek drains  of area, receives about 45.4 in/year of precipitation, has a wetness index of 445.07, and is about 45% forested.

See also
 List of rivers of Pennsylvania

References

Rivers of Pennsylvania
Rivers of Crawford County, Pennsylvania
Rivers of Erie County, Pennsylvania